Jan Naudé de Villiers (born 6 March 1980) is a South African politician who has served in the National Assembly of South Africa. A member of the Democratic Alliance, he is currently serving as the Shadow Minister of Small Business Development. He previously held the post of Shadow Minister on the Auditor-General.

Education
De Villiers holds a Bachelor of Arts in humanity studies from the University of Stellenbosch.

Political career
Prior to his election to parliament, De Villiers was a DA councillor and a member of the mayoral committee in the Stellenbosch Local Municipality.

De Villiers stood as a DA parliamentary candidate from the Western Cape in the 2019 national elections, and was subsequently elected to the National Assembly and sworn in on 22 May 2019. On 5 June 2019, he was appointed by the DA parliamentary leader, Mmusi Maimane, as Shadow Minister of the Auditor-General, succeeding Alan McLoughlin, who retired from politics. Later that month, he became a member of the Standing Committee on Auditor-General.

Maimane resigned as DA leader in October 2019 and John Steenhuisen was voted in as his interim successor in November 2019. He temporarily retained Maimane's shadow cabinet.  After Steenhuisen was elected leader for a full term at the 2020 Democratic Alliance Federal Congress, he announced his Shadow Cabinet on 5 December 2020, in which De Villiers was appointed as Shadow Minister of Small Business Development, succeeding Zakhele Mbhele. On 7 December, he became a member of the  Portfolio Committee on Small Business Development.

In the 2020 Register of Members’ Interests, de Villiers declared that he was a director of two property investment companies. He also disclosed that he was a co-owner of the Eikestad Mall in Stellenbosch and has the benefit of free parking at the shopping centre.

References

External links

Living people
1980 births
Afrikaner people
People from the Western Cape
Stellenbosch University alumni
Members of the National Assembly of South Africa
Democratic Alliance (South Africa) politicians